Serge Torsarkissian (also spelled Tour-Sarkissian) (in Arabic  سيرج طورسركيسيان, in Armenian Սերժ Թորսարգիսեան ) is a Lebanese member of parliament representing the Armenian Catholic seat in Beirut.

He was first elected in 2000 on the list of prime minister Rafic Hariri and is part of the coalition of the nationalist Future Movement, led by the assassinated prime minister's son Saad Hariri. He was re-elected in 2005 and 2009.

See also
 Lebanese Parliament
 Members of the 2009-2013 Lebanese Parliament

References

Living people
Members of the Parliament of Lebanon
Lebanese people of Armenian descent
Year of birth missing (living people)